Martin Parýzek (born 23 March 1989) is a Czech professional ice hockey defenceman for IHC Písek of the Czech 2. liga.

Parýzek previously played in the Czech Extraliga with Motor České Budějovice and HC Karlovy Vary.

References

External links

1989 births
Living people
HC Baník Sokolov players
Motor České Budějovice players
Czech ice hockey defencemen
HC Dukla Jihlava players
BK Havlíčkův Brod players
HC Karlovy Vary players
HC Most players
Orlik Opole players
Ottawa 67's players
Piráti Chomutov players
IHC Písek players
People from České Budějovice District
Sportspeople from the South Bohemian Region
Czech expatriate ice hockey players in Canada
Czech expatriate ice hockey players in Germany
Expatriate ice hockey players in Poland
Czech expatriate sportspeople in Poland